Psychedelic therapy (or psychedelic-assisted therapy) refers to the proposed use of psychedelic drugs, such as psilocybin, MDMA, LSD, and ayahuasca, to treat mental disorders. As of 2021, psychedelic drugs are controlled substances in most countries and psychedelic therapy is not legally available outside clinical trials, with some exceptions.

The procedure for psychedelic therapy differs from that of therapies using conventional psychiatric medications. While conventional medications are usually taken without supervision at least once daily, in contemporary psychedelic therapy the drug is administered in a single session (or sometimes up to three sessions) in a therapeutic context. The therapeutic team prepares the patient for the experience beforehand and helps them integrate insights from the drug experience afterwards. After ingesting the drug, the patient normally wears eyeshades and listens to music to facilitate focus on the psychedelic experience, with the therapeutic team interrupting only to provide reassurance if adverse effects such as anxiety or disorientation arise.

As of 2022, the body of high-quality evidence on psychedelic therapy remains relatively small and more, larger studies are needed to reliably show the effectiveness and safety of psychedelic therapy's various forms and applications. On the basis of favorable early results, ongoing research is examining proposed psychedelic therapies for conditions including major depressive disorder, anxiety and depression linked to terminal illness, and post-traumatic stress disorder. The United States Food and Drug Administration has granted "breakthrough therapy" status, which expedites the assessment of promising drug therapies for potential approval, to psychedelic therapies using psilocybin (for treatment-resistant depression and major depressive disorder) and MDMA (for post-traumatic stress disorder).

History

Prehistoric use of psychedelic substances 
Humans have long consumed psychedelic substances derived from cacti, seeds, bark, and roots of various plants and fungi. Since ancient times, shamans and medicine men have used psychedelics as a way to gain access to the spirit world. Though western culture usually views the practice of shamans and medicine men as predominantly spiritual in nature, elements of psychotherapeutic practice can be read into the entheogenic or shamanic rituals of many cultures.

Research in the mid-20th century 

Shortly after Albert Hofmann discovered the psychoactive properties of LSD in 1943, Sandoz Laboratories began widespread distribution of LSD to researchers in 1949. Throughout the 1950s and 1960s, scientists in several countries conducted extensive research into experimental chemotherapeutic, and psychotherapeutic uses of psychedelic drugs. In addition to spawning six international conferences and the release of dozens of books, over 1,000 peer-reviewed clinical papers detailing the use of psychedelic compounds (administered to approximately 40,000 patients) were published by the mid-1960s. Proponents believed that psychedelic drugs facilitated psychoanalytic processes, making them particularly useful for patients with conditions such as alcoholism that are otherwise difficult to treat. However, many of these trials did not meet the methodological standards that are required today.

Researchers like Timothy Leary felt psychedelics could alter the fundamental personality structure or subjective value-system of an individual to great potential benefit. Beginning in 1961, he conducted experiments with prison inmates in an attempt to reduce recidivism with short, intense psychotherapy sessions. Participants were administered psilocybin during these sessions weeks apart with regular group therapy sessions in between. Psychedelic therapy was also applied in a number of other specific patient populations including alcoholism, children with autism, and persons with terminal illness.

Regulation and prohibition in the late 20th century 
Throughout the 1960s, concerns raised about the proliferation of unauthorized use of psychedelic drugs by the general public (and, most notably, the counterculture) resulted in the imposition of increasingly severe restrictions on medical and psychiatric research conducted with psychedelic substances. Many countries either banned LSD outright or made it extremely scarce, and, bowing to governmental concerns, Sandoz halted production of LSD in 1965. During a congressional hearing in 1966, Senator Robert F. Kennedy questioned the shift of opinion, stating, "Perhaps to some extent we have lost sight of the fact that (LSD) can be very, very helpful in our society if used properly." In 1968, Dahlberg and colleagues published an article in the American Journal of Psychiatry detailing various forces that had successfully discredited legitimate LSD research. The essay argues that individuals in government and the pharmaceutical industry sabotaged the psychedelic research community by canceling ongoing studies and analysis while labeling genuine scientists as charlatans.

Studies on medicinal applications of psychedelics ceased entirely in the United States when the Controlled Substances Act was passed in 1970. LSD and many other psychedelics were placed into the most restrictive "Schedule I" category by the United States Drug Enforcement Administration. Schedule I compounds are claimed to possess "significant potential for abuse and dependence" and have "no recognized medicinal value", effectively rendering them illegal to use in the United States for all purposes. Despite objections from the scientific community, authorized research into therapeutic applications of psychedelic drugs had been discontinued worldwide by the 1980s.

Despite broad prohibition, unofficial psychedelic research and therapeutic sessions continued nevertheless in the following decades. Some therapists exploited windows of opportunity preceding scheduling of particular psychedelic drugs. Informal psychedelic therapy was conducted clandestinely in underground networks consisting of sessions carried out both by licensed therapists and autodidacts within the community. Due to the largely illegal nature of psychedelic therapy in this period, little information is available concerning the methods that were used. Individuals having published information between 1980 and 2000 regarding psychedelic psychotherapy include George Greer, Ann and Alexander Shulgin (PiHKAL and TiHKAL), Myron Stolaroff (The Secret Chief, regarding the underground therapy done by Leo Zeff), and Athanasios Kafkalides.

Resurgence in the early 21st century 

In the early 2000s, a renewal of interest in the psychiatric use of psychedelics contributed to an increase in clinical research centering on the psychopharmacological effects of these drugs and their subsequent applications. Advances in science and technology allowed researchers to collect and interpret extensive data from animal studies, and the advent of new technologies such as PET and MRI scanning made it possible to examine the sites of action of hallucinogens in the brain. Furthermore, retrospective studies involving users of illicit drugs as voluntary subjects were conducted, allowing data to be collected on how psychedelics affect the human brain while simultaneously sidestepping bureaucratic difficulties associated with providing illegal substances to subjects. The new century also ushered in a broader change in political attitude towards psychedelic medicine—specifically within the Food and Drug Administration. Curtis Wright, then deputy director of the FDA Division of Anesthetic, Critical Care and Addiction Drugs explained a motivation for this change: "the agency was challenged legally in a number of cases and also underwent a process of introspection, asking 'Is it proper to treat this class of drugs differently?'"

As of 2014, global treaties listing LSD and psilocybin as "Schedule I" controlled substances continues to inhibit a better understanding of these drugs. Much of the renewed clinical research has been conducted with psilocybin and MDMA in the United States with special permission and breakthrough therapy designations by the FDA, while other studies have investigated the mechanisms and effects of ayahuasca and LSD. MDMA-assisted psychotherapy is being actively researched by MAPS. Only six formal studies on the applications of LSD occurred between 1990 and 2017. No complications of LSD administration were observed.

As of 2021, many new centers for psychedelics research have been launched, including the Centre for Psychedelic Research at Imperial College London, the UC Berkeley Center for the Science of Psychedelics, the Center for Psychedelic and Consciousness Research at Johns Hopkins University, the Center for Psychedelic Research and Therapy at Dell Medical School at the University of Texas at Austin, the Center for Psychedelic Psychotherapy and Trauma Research at the Icahn School of Medicine at Mount Sinai, and the Psychae Institute in Melbourne.

Applications 

Psychedelic substances which may have therapeutic uses include psilocybin (the main active compound found in magic mushrooms), LSD, and mescaline (the main active compound in the peyote cactus). Although the history behind these substances has hindered research into their potential medicinal value, scientists are now able to conduct studies and renew research that was halted in the 1970s. Some research has shown that these substances have helped people with such mental disorders as obsessive-compulsive disorder, post-traumatic stress disorder, alcoholism, depression, and cluster headaches. Some of the well known particular psychedelic substances that have been used to this day are: LSD, DMT, psilocybin, mescaline, 2C-B, 2C-I, 5-MeO-DMT, AMT, ibogaine and DOM. In general, however, the drugs remain poorly understood. Their effects are strongly dependent on the environment in which they are given and on the recipient's state of mind (set and setting).

In alcoholism
Studies by Humphry Osmond, Betty Eisner, and others examined the possibility that psychedelic therapy could treat alcoholism (or, less commonly, other addictions). A 1998 review of the effectiveness of psychedelic therapy for treating alcoholism concluded that due to methodological difficulties in the research prior to that time, it was not possible to state whether it was effective. A 2012 meta-analysis found that "In a pooled analysis of six randomized controlled clinical trials, a single dose of LSD had a significant beneficial effect on alcohol misuse at the first reported follow-up assessment, which ranged from 1 to 12 months after discharge from each treatment program. This treatment effect from LSD on alcohol misuse was also seen at 2 to 3 months and at 6 months, but was not statistically significant at 12 months post-treatment. Among the three trials that reported total abstinence from alcohol use, there was also a significant beneficial effect of LSD at the first reported follow-up, which ranged from 1 to 3 months after discharge from each treatment program."

In terminal illness
During the early 1950s and 1960s the National Institute of Mental Health sponsored the study of psychedelic drugs such as psilocybin and LSD to alleviate the debilitating anxiety and depression patients with terminal diagnoses may feel. While these early studies are hard to find, the resurgence of interest in psychedelic drugs to treat humans end of life mindset has led to some small studies in the 21st Century. The more recently published research strengthens the findings from the 1950s and 1960s showing the drug is extremely effective in reducing anxiety and depression in this patient population once carefully screened and has few adverse effects when administered in a psychotherapy setting and under medical supervision. The psychologists leading psychedelic drug therapy trials found that end of life patients often experience the emotional turmoil of dying more than the physical aspects. This mindset makes it difficult for patients to find meaning and enjoyment in life during their last few months or years. While all patients have completely different experiences on these mind altering drugs the research subjects interviewed all expressed they had, "heightened clarity and confidence about their personal values and priorities, and a renewed or enhanced recognition of intrinsic meaning and value of life." More recently, researchers have argued that psychedelic therapy is beneficial for these patients because it may specifically reduce their fear of dying.

As of 2016, Johns Hopkins University and New York University have conducted large randomized, placebo-controlled studies. These two studies are some of the first large controlled studies measuring the effects of psychedelic therapy on depression and anxiety in cancer patients. Across clinician-ratings and self-ratings, the psychedelic treatment produced statistically significant lowered anxiety and depression, with sustenance for at least 6 months. The studies monitored for adverse effects from the drugs but no serious adverse effects were observed. Both studies also attributed the efficacy in part to patients experiencing a "mystical experience". A mystical experience is a very personal introspective experience where some sort of unity or transcendence of time and space is described. More research is necessary to expand generalizability of the conclusions. Also, more research is necessary to understand the biological properties of a mystical experience.

In post-traumatic stress disorder (PTSD) 
The Multidisciplinary Association for Psychedelic Studies (MAPS) is conducting studies seeking to understand how MDMA could be helpful in the treatment of post-traumatic stress disorder. The Phase 2 trials of these studies, conducted in the U.S., Canada, and Israel, consisted of 107 participants who had chronic, treatment-resistant PTSD, and had had PTSD for an average of 17.8 years. Out of the 107 participants, 61% no longer qualified for PTSD after three sessions of MDMA-assisted psychotherapy two months after the treatment. At the 12-month follow-up session, 68% no longer had PTSD. Phase 2 trials conducted between 2004 and 2010 reported an overall remission rate of 66.2% and low rates of adverse effects for subjects with chronic PTSD. In 2017, MAPS and the FDA reached an agreement on the special protocol for phase 3 trials.
 
It is important to note that given the difficulties with appropriate blinding in trials of MDMA- and psychedelic-assisted psychotherapy the results are likely overestimated. Furthermore, there are no superiority or non-inferiority clinical trials comparing MDMA-assisted psychotherapy to already existent evidence-based treatments for PTSD, but given the effects reported in clinical trials of MDMA-assisted psychotherapy for PTSD there is no reason to believe that this treatment modality is more effective than existent trauma-focused psychological treatments.

In depressive and anxiety disorders 
In 2019, the FDA approved the use of esketamine for intranasal use for major depressive disorder (MDD), and treatment-resistant depression (TRD), in conjunction with an oral antidepressant.

Also in 2019, the FDA granted "breakthrough therapy" status to psilocybin for treatment-resistant depression and major depressive disorder in order to hasten the process for potential regulatory approval. The designation of "breakthrough therapy" fast-tracks the study of drugs where preliminary clinical evidence shows that they could be substantially more effective than therapies that are already available.

Studies on the clinical effects of ayahuasca have found significant antidepressant and anxiolytic effects, leading to calls for further research to overcome methodological limitations in the existing studies.

Contraindications
Psychedelic therapy is contraindicated for people who:

 are pregnant,
 have a history of epilepsy/other seizure disorder,
 have severe cardiovascular disease including uncontrolled blood pressure, heart failure, coronary artery disease or previous heart attack or stroke,
 use medications like SSRI or MAO-I antidepressants,
 have a personal or family history of primary psychotic or affective disorders like Schizophrenia, Schizoaffective disorder, Bipolar 1 disorder, or psychotic symptoms in the setting of depression.

Methods

Standard psychedelic therapy
The main approach used in the contemporary resurgence of research, often simply called psychedelic therapy, involves the use of moderate-to-high doses of psychedelic drugs. The psychedelic therapy method was initiated by Humphry Osmond and Abram Hoffer (with some influence from Al Hubbard) and replicated by Keith Ditman, and is more closely aligned to transpersonal psychology than to traditional psychoanalysis. Most recent research on psychedelic therapy has used psilocybin or ayahuasca.

Patients spend most of the acute period of the drug's activity lying down with eyeshades listening to music selected beforehand and exploring their inner experience. Dialogue with the therapists the drug session(s) but essential during the preparation session before and the integration session afterwards. The therapeutic team normally consists of a man and a woman, who are both present throughout the psychedelic experience. One aspect that occurs in most participants undergoing psychedelic therapy with moderate-to-high doses is transcendental, mystical, or peak experiences. Research has suggested that the strength of these experiences, together with discussion of them soon after in a therapeutic session, could be a major determinant of how great the longer-term effects on symptoms will be.

Some studies of psychedelic therapy have incorporated cognitive behavioral therapy (CBT) or motivational enhancement therapy (MET). Within a structured CBT intervention and a dose of psilocybin, patients are given the opportunity to experience cognitive and emotional states that are altered. With these psychedelic effects, cognitive reframing of detrimental schemas and self-identity can be modified positively. In a MET environment, patients are able to reflect on their own behaviors to make changes in problematic manners, such as alcohol use disorder. Additionally, it could potentially enhance motivation to change and decrease possible ambivalence about behavioral changes. Within psychedelic drug sessions, through a reevaluation of the concept of self and reconnecting with core beliefs and values, this can be achieved.

Psycholytic therapy
Psycholytic therapy involves the use of low-to-medium doses of psychedelic drugs, repeatedly at intervals of 1–2 weeks. The therapist is present during the peak of the experience to assist the patient in processing material that arises and to offer support. This general form of therapy was mostly used to treat patients with neurotic and psychosomatic disorders. The name psycholytic therapy was coined by Ronald A. Sandison, literally meaning "soul-dissolving", refers to the belief that the therapy can dissolve conflicts in the mind. Psycholytic therapy was historically an important approach to psychedelic psychotherapy in Europe, and was also practiced in the United States by some psychotherapists, including Betty Eisner. In the time since the 1970s, psycholytic therapy has not been a focus of research.

Psychedelic drugs are useful for exploring the subconscious because a conscious sliver of the adult ego usually remains active during the experience. Patients remain intellectually alert throughout the process and remember their experiences vividly afterward. In this highly introspective state, patients are actively aware of ego defenses such as projection, denial, and displacement as they react to themselves and their choices.

The ultimate goal of the therapy is to provide a safe, mutually compassionate context through which the profound and intense reliving of memories can be filtered through the principles of genuine psychotherapy. Aided by the deeply introspective state attained by the patient, the therapist assists him/her in developing a new life framework or personal philosophy that recognizes individual responsibility for change.

In Germany, Hanscarl Leuner designed a form of psycholytic therapy, which was developed officially but was also used by some socio-politically motivated underground therapists in the 1970s.

Other variations

Claudio Naranjo
The Chilean therapist Claudio Naranjo developed a branch of psychedelic therapy that utilized drugs like MDA, MDMA, harmaline and ibogaine.

Anaclitic therapy
The term anaclitic (from the Ancient Greek "ἀνάκλιτος", anaklitos – "for reclining") refers to primitive, infantile needs and tendencies directed toward a pre-genital love object. Developed by two London psychoanalysts, Joyce Martin and Pauline McCririck, this form of treatment is similar to psycholytic approaches as it is based largely on a psychoanalytic interpretation of abreactions produced by the treatment, but it tends to focus on those experiences in which the patient re-encounters carnal feelings of emotional deprivation and frustration stemming from the infantile needs of their early childhood. As a result, the treatment was developed with the aim to directly fulfill or satisfy those repressed, agonizing cravings for love, physical contact, and other instinctual needs re-lived by the patient. Therefore, the therapist is completely engaged with the subject, as opposed to the traditional detached attitude of the psychoanalyst. With the intense emotional episodes that came with the psychedelic experience, Martin and McCririck aimed to sit in as the "mother" role who would enter into close physical contact with the patients by rocking them, giving them milk from a bottle, etc.

Hypnodelic therapy
Hypnodelic therapy, as the name suggests, was developed with the goal to maximize the power of hypnotic suggestion by combining it with the psychedelic experience. After training the patient to respond to hypnosis, LSD would be administered, and during the onset phase of the drug the patient would be placed into a state of trance. Levine and Ludwig found the combination of these techniques to be more effective than the use of either of these two components separately.

Public interest 
A resurgence of public interest in psychedelic drug therapy in the 21st century has been driven in part by articles in The New Yorker, The New York Times and The Wall Street Journal. Articles on psychedelic therapy in The New York Times have included "How Psychedelic Drugs Can Help Patients Face Death" (April 20, 2012) and "My Adventures With the Trip Doctors" (May 15, 2018).

Psychedelic tourism 

The first article to bring attention to the uses of psychedelic drugs for mental health was titled, "Seeking the Magic Mushroom," written by Robert Gordon Wasson and published in 1957 by TIME magazine. It detailed his experience traveling to Oaxaca, Mexico and taking "magic mushrooms" (psilocybin) within the cultural practices that started the "trip" experience. Since that time there has been growing interest within the United States to travel for these unique psychedelic experiences. The market for psychedelic tourism is currently growing rapidly. While typically the vacation destinations for psychedelics are based in Central and South America there is a rise in western culture taking over their traditional practices. In the Netherlands there are psychedelic society retreats that range from $500–1200 that center on a ceremony in which tourists take magic mushrooms and trip together for around six hours. There are also underground psychedelic "guides" popping up around the United States that include leaders who claim to assist people through their trip similar to shamans in other cultures. An article in The Guardian entitled "Welcome to the trip of your life: the rise of underground LSD guides" details various styles of guides that can be found within the United States.

See also 

 :Category:Psychedelic drug researchers
 Concord Prison Experiment
 Hallucinogen
 History of lysergic acid diethylamide
 James Fadiman
 
 Psychedelic microdosing
 Rick Doblin
 Roland R. Griffiths
 Psychoplastogen

Notes

References

External links 
 History of LSD Therapy (Ch. 1 of Grof's, LSD Psychotherapy)
 The Second International Conference on the Use of LSD in Psychotherapy and Alcoholism (1967) (entire book)

Alternative medical treatments
Drug discovery
History of psychiatry
Psychedelic drug research
Psychiatric research